Mount Banks, a mountain within the Explorers Range of the Blue Mountains Range that is a spur off the Great Dividing Range, is located within the Blue Mountains National Park, approximately  west of Sydney in New South Wales, Australia.

Geography
Mount Banks is part of the Explorers Range, which is located along the northern escarpment of the Grose Valley in the Blue Mountains National Park. The Explorers Range starts at Bells Line of Road and extends along the northern edge of the Grose Valley. It was named Mount Banks in 1804 by the explorer George Caley, who had worked for the botanist Sir Joseph Banks. Caley was the first European to reach Mount Banks.

The distinctive thing about Mount Banks is the way the terrain and vegetation change radically approaching the top of the mountain. For the first two-thirds of the walk, the terrain is the triassic sandstone, often seen in the Blue Mountains,
with a thin, rough scrub. After this, however, there is a basalt cap which gives rise to a richly vegetated environment with grass and a canopy. Views can be had on the lower slopes of the mountains but there is no view at the top, unless the walker edges down the slope towards the escarpment, at which point there are views of the Grose Valley.

Description
At this point, vehicular access comes to an end. From this point on, there is a fire trail that follows the Explorers Range before terminating above Zobel Gully. According to the topographic map, there is an abandoned mine in Zobel Gully, but there is no track to it.

Activities

Photography is also popular because of the extensive views. There is no authorised camp site at Mt. Banks and camping at this fragile world heritage site is strictly prohibited.

See also

List of mountains in New South Wales

References

Banks
Banks